The 1960–61 Yugoslav First League season was won by FK Partizan, which was the club's third title and its first in twelve years. The season was also a coming-out party of sorts for the club's talented new generation of young players known as "Partizan's babies" that would dominate Yugoslav football for the next few years and would even go on to make it to the 1966 European Cup final.

The season began later than usual in order to accommodate the Yugoslav Olympic national team's late August and early September 1960 participation at the 1960 Rome Olympics where they won the gold medal with a roster consisting entirely of players from the Yugoslav First League.

Teams
At the end of the previous season Budućnost and Sloboda were relegated. They were replaced by Vardar and RNK Split.

League table

Results

Winning squad
Champions:
FK Partizan (head coach: Stjepan Bobek)

player (league matches/league goals)
Tomislav Kaloperović (22/7)
Milutin Šoškić (22/0) (goalkeeper)
Velibor Vasović (22/1)
Fahrudin Jusufi (22/0)
Milan Galić (21/14)
Milan Vukelić (20/8)
Joakim Vislavski (20/5)
Vladica Kovačević (18/4)
Lazar Radović (17/3)
Jovan Miladinović (16/2)
Branislav Mihajlović (12/5)
Aleksandar Jončić (11/0)
Velimir Sombolac (9/0)
Bora Milutinović (6/2)
Bruno Belin (5/0)
Ilija Mitić (5/0)
Božidar Pajević (5/0)
Milorad Milutinović (2/0)
Miodrag Petrović (1/0)
Dragomir Slišković (1/0)

Top scorers

See also
1960–61 Yugoslav Second League
1960–61 Yugoslav Cup

External links
Yugoslavia Domestic Football Full Tables

Yugoslav First League seasons
Yugo
1960–61 in Yugoslav football